Toby Steven Holland is an English professional footballer who plays as a midfielder for Bishop's Cleeve.

Career
On 13 November 2019, after progressing through Swindon Town's academy, Holland made his debut for the club in a 1–0 EFL Trophy loss against Bristol Rovers. On 7 January 2021, Holland left the club following the expiration of his contract.

In February 2022, Holland signed for Southern Football League Division One Central club Cinderford Town having previously played for Evesham United and Highworth Town following his release from Swindon. In January 2023, Holland signed for league rivals Bishop's Cleeve.

Career statistics

References

External links
Toby Holland at My Football Database

Living people
Association football midfielders
English footballers
Swindon Town F.C. players
Evesham United F.C. players
Highworth Town F.C. players
Cinderford Town A.F.C. players
Bishop's Cleeve F.C. players
Southern Football League players
2001 births